Thiri Maya Dewi Mwei Daw (1330s – 28 January 1368) was a principal queen of King Binnya U of Martaban–Hanthawaddy, and the mother of King Razadarit.

Brief
Mwei Daw was the youngest daughter of Than-Bon, a senior minister at the court of King Binnya U. Than-Bon was a son of Senior Minister Bo Htu-Hpyet who served at the court of King Wareru. In 1348/49, soon after the accession of Binnya U, she was married to Gov. Min Linka of Pegu, younger half-brother of Binnya U. Her three elder sisters Mwei It, Mwei Kaw and Mwei Zeik became principal queens of Binnya U. She and Linka had two daughters—Thazin Saw Dala and Thazin Saw U—and a son, Nyi Kan-Kaung.

C. 1353, her husband revolted against Binnya U. But the rebellion failed. Min Linka was arrested, and executed. Binnya U raised his sister-in-law to queen with the title of Thiri Maya Dewi. In 1368, she bore him a son named A-Pa-Thon but died soon after the birth in Donwun. The son later became King Razadarit.

Notes

References

Bibliography
 

Queens consort of Hanthawaddy
1368 deaths
Deaths in childbirth